The 2005 Hopman Cup (also known as the Hyundai Hopman Cup for sponsorship reasons) was the 17th edition of the Hopman Cup. Slovakia's Daniela Hantuchová and Dominik Hrbatý of Slovakia were the champions, when they defeated Argentina in the final. It was Slovakia's second Hopman Cup win. The event took place at the Burswood Entertainment Complex in Perth from 1 January 2005 through 8 January 2005. The round robin event had one African nation that played in the main draw of this year's Hopman Cup: Zimbabwe, who lost 1–2 to The Netherlands.

Play-off

Netherlands vs. Zimbabwe

Group A

Teams and standings
Teams and seeds of the 2005 Hopman Cup in Group A were:
 – Gisela Dulko and Guillermo Coria (Round robin win–loss: 3–0; match win–loss: 6–3)
 – Anna-Lena Grönefeld and Tommy Haas (Round robin win–loss: 2–1; match win–loss: 5–4)
 – Francesca Schiavone and Davide Sanguinetti (Round robin win–loss: 1–2; match win–loss: 4–5)
 – Anastasia Myskina and Marat Safin (Round robin win–loss: 0–3; match win–loss: 3–6)

Argentina vs. Germany

Argentina vs. Italy

Argentina vs. Russia

Germany vs. Italy

Germany vs. Russia

Italy vs. Russia

Group B

Teams and standings
Teams of the 2005 Hopman Cup in Group B were:

 – Alicia Molik and either Paul Baccanello or Mark Philippoussis (Round robin win–loss: 1–2; match win–loss: 4–5)
 – Michaëlla Krajicek and Peter Wessels (round robin win–loss: 2–2; match win–loss: 6–6)
 – Daniela Hantuchová and Dominik Hrbatý (round robin win–loss: 2–1; match win–loss: 6–3)
 – Meghann Shaughnessy and James Blake (Round robin win–loss: 2–1; match win–loss: 5–4)
 – Cara Black and Wayne Black (Round robin win–loss: match win–loss: 1–2)

Australia vs. Slovakia

Netherlands vs. Australia

Slovakia vs. Netherlands

Slovakia vs. United States

United States vs. Australia

United States vs. Netherlands

Final

Slovakia vs. Argentina

External links

2005 Hopman Cup Article from the ITF

2005
Hopman Cup
Hopman Cup